This is a list of people associated with the University of Valle, Colombia.  This list includes nationally or internationally notable alumni, current or previous faculty and staff members, and its former rectors.  The University of Valle is a public, departmental, coeducational, research university based primarily in the city of Cali, Valle del Cauca. It is the largest higher education institution by student population in the southwest of the country, and the third in Colombia, with more than 30,320 students.  Each year, about 2,300 undergraduate and 600 postgraduate students finish their studies.

Notable alumni 
 Sabas Pretelt de la Vega
 Antonio Navarro Wolff
 Saúl Balagura
Dilian Francisca Toro
Gustavo Álvarez Gardeazábal
Andrés Caicedo
Alba Lucía Potes Cortés
Carlos Barbosa
Sandra Bessudo
Mauro Castillo
Raúl Cuero
José Fernando Escobar
Reinaldo Rueda
Claudia Blum
Mary Jane West-Eberhard
Estanislao Zuleta
José Santacruz Londoño
Susan Bernal

Notes

References

External links 
 University of Valle Alumni Program
 Internal Medicine Alumni Association
 Cooperative of University of Valle Alumni

Valle
People